The Men's 4 x 400 metres relay athletics events for the 2016 Summer Paralympics took place at the Estádio Olímpico João Havelange between 16 and 17 September 2016. One event was contested over this distance with each leg being run by one of the two different classifications, T53 and T54.

Schedule

Results

T53-54
Two heats were held on 16 September. The four fastest teams over both legs qualified for the final on the 17 September.

Round 1 - Heat 1

Round 1 - Heat 2

Final

References

Athletics at the 2016 Summer Paralympics
2016 in men's athletics